Rodney Fritz Jr. (born May 8, 1987) is an American football defensive lineman who is currently a free agent.

Early life
Born the son of Jennifer and Rodney Fritz, Rodney attended Hickman High School in Kansas City, Missouri. There he was named all-state as tight end, after having 21 receptions for 549 yards and nine touchdowns, and was an honorable mention as a linebacker. He was also named all conference in basketball.

College career

Highland
In 2006, Rodney attended Highland CC, where he played in nine games, registering 71 tackles (46 solo, 25 assists), and posted three sacks with 9.5 tackles for a loss (37 yards). He also managed one forced fumble. As a result, he was named to the Kansas Jayhawk Community College Conference Second Team.

L.A. Pierce
In 2007, Rodney transferred to Los Angeles Pierce College, where he played in nine games, registering 98 tackles (61 solo, 37 assists), and posted seven sacks with 19 tackles for a loss (37 yards). He also managed one interception, three forced fumbles and two fumble recoveries. As a result, he was named to the Western State Conference First Team.

Tennessee State
As a junior in 2008, he transferred to Tennessee State University, where he played in 17 games, recording 40 tackles (9 of which were sacks).

Professional career

Huntington Hammer
In 2011, Fritz signed with the Huntington Hammer of the Ultimate Indoor Football League. There he led the Hammer defense in tackles-for-loss, was second on the team in sacks, and recorded the most forced fumbles.

Tulsa Talons
On Friday, July 15, 2011, the Tulsa Talons signed Rondey. By signing with the Talons, Fritz became the first UIFL player to sign with an Arena Football League team.

Winnipeg Blue Bombers
Signed as a free agent on August 9, 2011 to the practice roster  with the Winnipeg Blue Bombers of the Canadian Football League.

During the 2013 CFL training camp, Fritz was released by the Blue Bombers.

Toronto Argonauts
On August 5, 2013, Fritz signed a practice roster agreement with the Toronto Argonauts of the Canadian Football League.  He was released by the Argonauts on August 21, 2013.

Los Angeles KISS
On November 11, 2015, Fritz was assigned to the Los Angeles KISS. On June 17, 2016, Fritz was placed on reassignment.

Arizona Rattlers
On June 20, 2016, Fritz was claimed by the Arizona Rattlers.

Baltimore Brigade
On March 22, 2018, Fritz was assigned to the Baltimore Brigade.

Albany Empire
On April 4, 2019, Fritz was assigned to the Albany Empire.

References

External links

Rodney Fritz - CFL profile

1987 births
Hickman High School alumni
Living people
American football defensive linemen
Canadian football defensive linemen
African-American players of American football
African-American players of Canadian football
Tennessee State Tigers football players
Huntington Hammer players
Tulsa Talons players
Winnipeg Blue Bombers players
San Jose SaberCats players
Pierce Brahmas football players
Los Angeles Kiss players
Baltimore Brigade players
Albany Empire (AFL) players
Players of American football from Kansas City, Missouri
Players of Canadian football from Kansas City, Missouri